Earl F. "Marty" Martin III (born December 16, 1961 in Lexington, Kentucky) is the president of Drake University. The thirteenth president of Drake, he has served in that capacity since 2015; previously he served as executive vice president of Gonzaga University.

Early life
Martin has a degree in law from University of Kentucky College of Law and an advanced law degree from Yale Law School.  Following graduation from law school Martin worked for the United States Air Force's Judge Advocate General corps.

Academic career
After his military service, Martin joined Texas Wesleyan University School of Law as a professor and later associate dean in 1997. Following eight years at Texas Weseylan, he moved to Gonzaga, where he served as dean of the Gonzaga University School of Law before later ascending to executive vice president in 2010. He became President of Drake University in July 2015.

References

External links
Drake University biography

Living people
Presidents of Drake University
Yale Law School alumni
University of Kentucky College of Law alumni
Place of birth missing (living people)
1961 births